The Hundred Flowers Award for Best Director was first awarded by the China Film Association in 1962. 
During 1981-2004, there were no awards presented in the Best Director category.

Records

2010s

2000s

1980s

1960s

References

Director
Awards for best director